Shamim Malende (born 1980), is a Ugandan lawyer, a commissioner for oaths, a notary public, politician and community activist. She is a member of the People Power, Our Power Movement and of the National Unity Platform (NUP) political party. She is the only woman on the legal team of Robert Kyagulanyi Ssentamu. In the 2021 general election she was elected to Parliament as the Women's Representative for Kampala District for the 2021-2026 term.

Early life and education 
Malende was born in Kawempe, Kampala, Uganda's capital city, in December 1980, to Alhajj Jamal Ahmed Sebuta Malende, an attorney, and Jane Francis Nasunna, a school teacher.

She attended Busaale Church of Uganda Primary School in Kayunga District. She completed her O-Level studies at Buziga Islamic Theological Institute in Bbunga, a neighborhood in Makindye Division, Kampala. She then transferred to Aisha Girls High School in the city of Mbarara, in the Western Region of Uganda. She graduated as the best student in the Western Region and among the top ten in the country after scoring AAAA in her A-Level examinations in 2000.

She was admitted to Makerere University, Uganda's oldest and largest public university, on government sponsorship. She graduated with a Bachelor of Laws degree in 2005. She then went on to obtain a postgraduate Diploma in Legal Practice, from the Law Development Centre in Kampala. She was admitted to the Uganda Bar in 2008.

Career
After graduation from university, she worked in her father’s chambers before opening her own legal practice, Malende & Company Advocates.

In the 2018-2020 time-frame, she has handled nearly 200 pro-bono cases of Ugandan citizens imprisoned for various political offenses. The majority of her clients are urban, young, poor,  and subscribe to the People Power, Our Power Movement and to the National Unity Platform political party. She was invited to join the People Power Legal Team, which is led by Asuman Basalirwa and Benjamin Katana.

Political ambition
In 2020, she declared her intention to contest as Woman Representative for Kampala City in the 2021 Uganda Parliamentary elections. This pitted her against Stella Nyanzi, who was also running for the same position, on the Forum for Democratic Change political party ticket. She won the seat.

See also
 Ligomarc Advocates

References

External links
 Women’s Day: Here are the ten most inspirational women in Uganda right now As of 8 March 2020.

1986 births
Living people
21st-century Ugandan lawyers
Ugandan women lawyers
Makerere University alumni
Law Development Centre alumni
Women human rights activists
Members of the Parliament of Uganda
Women members of the Parliament of Uganda
21st-century Ugandan politicians
21st-century Ugandan women politicians